Allen Spraggett (26 March 1932 – 19 July 2022) was a Canadian writer and broadcaster, known for his works concerning the paranormal.

Biography

During the 1950s, Spraggett was a minister of the Open Door Evangelical Church. He transferred to the United Church of Canada to become a minister there, then worked as the religion editor of Toronto Star. In the 1970s, he wrote The Unexplained, a syndicated newspaper column concerning the paranormal.

In 1975, Spraggett hosted a Canadian television show called E.S.P.  In 1976, M. Lamar Keene co-authored a self-expose of fraudulent mediumship, The Psychic Mafia "as told to" Allen Spraggett.

Spraggett was host of the CBC television quiz show Beyond Reason from 1977 to 1980. He also hosted the radio shows Sun Spots and The Unexplained on CFRB in Toronto.

In 1979, he was charged with two counts of gross indecency, based on allegations by youths from Winnipeg. Spraggett was acquitted of these charges in April 1980. However, he had difficulty in resuming his broadcasting and writing career after that trial.

During the early 1980s Spraggett provided the daily horoscope forecasts for the Pete and Geets morning drive show on CFNY FM in Toronto.  

Spraggett was a believer in faith healing and wrote a biography of Kathryn Kuhlman. He described Kuhlman as the "greatest faith healer since Biblical times."

Reception

Bibliography
 The Unexplained (1967) 
 The Bishop Pike Story (1970) 
 Kathryn Kuhlman : The Woman who Believes in Miracles (1970) 
 Probing the Unexplained (1971) 
 Arthur Ford, The Man Who Talked with the Dead (1973) 
 The Case for Immortality (1974) 
 The World of the Unexplained (1974) 
 The Spiritual Frontier (1975, co-writer with William Rauscher) 
 New Worlds of the Unexplained (1976) 
 The Psychic Mafia (1976, co-writer with M. Lamar Keene) 
 Ross Peterson: The New Edgar Cayce (1977)

References

External links
 

1932 births
2022 deaths
Canadian columnists
Canadian occult writers
Canadian television hosts
Parapsychologists
Writers from Toronto